is a kaiju who first appeared in Toho's 1975 film Terror of Mechagodzilla.

Overview

In Terror of Mechagodzilla, a mad scientist named Shinzo Mafune (Akihiko Hirata) discovers the Titanosaurus. He also claims that he possesses the ability to control the mind of the creature. Considered insane, he loses his academic credentials and is cast out from the scientific community. Quickly descending into madness, Mafune is able to gain control of Titanosaurus and joins forces with the Black Hole Aliens; the monster is used as the guardian of the destroyed Mechagodzilla's remains; an attack by Titanosaurus on a submarine sent to investigate the remains opens up the film. Dr. Mafune aids in the rebuilding and reconstruction of Mechagodzilla 2, and with both monsters under control, begins his revenge on humanity. After a lengthy battle across the Kantō region, Mechagodzilla 2 is destroyed by Godzilla, who then hits Titanosaurus with a blast of his atomic ray. Having already been left disoriented by the sonic wave gun of the humans, a dazed Titanosaurus then falls off a cliff into the ocean. Whether he survives or not is unknown.

Titanosaurus has not appeared in any films since, although he briefly appeared as stock footage in the opening credits of the 2004 Millennium film Godzilla: Final Wars as one of many monsters that arose from the devastation brought by the World Wars.

Titanosaurus is 60 meters (196 feet) tall and weighs 30,000 metric tons (33,069 short tons).

Titanosaurus makes a brief appearance in Godzilla: Project Mechagodzilla, a prequel novel to Godzilla: City on the Edge of Battle. In the novel humanity had caught several Titanosauruses in the Pacific Ocean and managed to control them. They were deployed to fight Godzilla in 2044, but they were all defeated by Godzilla.

Though Titanosaurus does not appear in Godzilla Singular Point, a new iteration of Godzilla known as Godzilla Aquatilis shares several design traits with Titanosaurus. These include a reddish coloration, antennae, and a fish-like tail.

Design
Titanosaurus shares its name with a real dinosaur taxa, though they do not share much beyond nomenclature; Titanosaurus' design is more reminiscent of spinosaurs, such as Spinosaurus or Suchomimus, as it shares the same aquatic adaptations, crocodile-like snout and sports a sail-like fin emerging from the dorsal side of his back, like the humps or spines of a spinosaur except for a fish-like tail. Originally, Titanosaurus was going to be two separate monsters called the Titans that would eventually merge into the final design, but due to budgetary restraints only the final form of the Titanosaurus suit was made. The roars of Titanosaurus are a combination of modified elephant trumpets and horse snorts.

Abilities
Aside from using teeth and claws to fight, Titanosaurus can, by employing his fluke-like tail as a fan, generate winds strong enough to demolish buildings and hurl debris at great velocities. When used in the water, it creates whirlpools powerful enough to completely immobilize submarines, in addition to its use as a high-powered propeller and rudder. Titanosaurus is quite hardy as well as a determined combatant, standing toe-to-toe and exchanging blows with Godzilla on a number of occasions, and in addition landing kicks and punches that propel his opponent great distances (He is even able to lift Godzilla off the ground with just his jaws), but even though Godzilla's atomic ray and extensive combat experience ultimately give him an edge when facing Titanosaurus one-on-one, as Titanosaurus seems to lack a ranged weapon in the film, Mechagodzilla 2's timely interventions allow his ally to retain or regain the initiative as necessary. Leading up to their first fight, the alien leader predicts Godzilla would be badly hurt with Titanosaurus dead which would end perfectly for them to finish off Godzilla and Tokyo with Mechagodzilla.

In Godzilla: Unleashed, Titanosaurus has a sonic beam as his ranged weapon; though ironic, the explanation given is that Titanosaurus' own sonar waves (generated whilst he was deep underwater) were disrupted by the humans' sonic device; as many undersea creatures evolve some kind of sonar or enormous eyes to see in the lowest parts of the ocean.

Appearances

Films
 Terror of Mechagodzilla (1975)
 Godzilla: Final Wars (2004, stock footage cameo)

Video games
 Battle Soccer: Field no Hasha (SNES - 1992)
 Kaijū-ō Godzilla / King of the Monsters, Godzilla (Game Boy - 1993)
 Godzilla Trading Battle (PlayStation - 1998)
 Godzilla: Unleashed (Wii - 2007)
 Godzilla Unleashed: Double Smash (NDS - 2007)
 Godzilla Defense Force (2019)

Literature
 Godzilla: Gangsters and Goliaths (comic - 2011)
 Godzilla: Legends (comic - 2011-2012)
 Godzilla: Ongoing (comic - 2012)
 Godzilla: Rulers of Earth (comic - 2013-2015)

References

Fictional undersea characters
Godzilla characters
Fictional characters with superhuman strength
Fictional mutants
Fictional dinosaurs
Film characters introduced in 1975
Kaiju
Fictional monsters
Toho monsters
Science fiction film characters
Fantasy film characters
Horror film villains